The Emdrup Junk Playground (Danish: Skrammellegepladsen Emdrup) is an adventure playground  located in Emdrup, a neighborhood in Copenhagen, Denmark.

History
The Emdrup Junk Playground was the first planned junk playground and is frequently cited as the "birthplace" of playwork.  It was opened in 1943 by a Workers' Cooperative Housing Association in  Emdrupvej (or Emdrup), near Copenhagen, Denmark, during the German occupation of the 1940s.  It grew out of a broader Danish resistance to Nazi occupation and parents' fears that "their children's play might be mistaken for acts of sabotage by soldiers."

The Emdrup Junk Playground emerged from a collaboration between Carl Theodor Sørensen, a Danish landscape architect commissioned by the architect Dan Fink to design a playground for the Emdrupvænge housing estate, and John (Jonas) Bertelsen (1917-1978), the playground's first "pædagoger". Sørensen had earlier worked in partnership with Hans Dragehjelm (1875-1948), the "father of the sand-box" and a co-founder of the Froebel Society in Denmark, on a plan to transform Cottageparken near Klampenborg, Denmark, into a children's park.  Their proposal was ultimately rejected, but has provided scholars of play with insight into the historical context from which the Emdrup playground emerged. See  and </ref>    Sørensen’s initial design did not require an adult "pædagoger", but Bertelsen was hired as part of the housing policy of the Emdrup Workers' Cooperative Housing Association.  Bertelsen stressed that play should be self-directed and pædagoger should allow children to pursue their own projects without adult interference.  Together they aimed to build a site that would afford children living in cities the same opportunities for free play with waste materials and tools that were enjoyed by children living in rural areas.

The original site was minimally landscaped by Sørensen to evoke the elements of the Danish rural landscape: "the beach, the meadow, and the grove."  The original site ran 65 meters from west to east and 82 meters in north to south, and consisted of a sandbox on a patch of grass enclosed by a fenced dyke planted with rosebushes, thornapple, and Acacia bushes, partly to screen the playground from view.  John Bertelsen coined the phrase skrammolog (or "junkology") to describe the children's play.   

 Marjory Allen, an English landscape architect and child welfare advocate, visited the Emdrup Junk Playground in 1946 for a few hours and wrote a widely-read article about the Emdrup Adventure playground titled Why Not Use Our Bomb Sites Like This?, which was published in Picture Post that year.

Changes
 

O'Connor and Palmer (2003) have described changes to the playground since 1943.  While children's play remains free and self-directed, the construction area has dwindled since the 1960s and the diversity of scrap and construction materials has been reduced.  Pre-built structures and a range of additional activities have been added.  These include gardening, basketball, soccer, and a clubhouse on the site, theatre productions, and vegetable and flower gardening.  Pre-programmed events have also been introduced, including the Skrammel Olympics and Cake and Bread Baking days.  Periodic efforts to segregate children by age and to transform the skrammellegepladsen into a conventional playground have met with opposition from play advocates.

The Emdrup playground is staffed by Danish pedagogues (pædagoger) and their assistants, known as pædagog-medhjælpere. Pedagogues also facilitate meetings with the  Parental Board of the recreational facility that houses the Emdrup Skrammellegepladsen.

See also 
 Adventure playground

Notes

References

Further reading
 Carl Theodor Sørensen, 1931 (reprint), "Parkpolitik i Sogn og Købstad", Copenhagen 1978,  
  (Containing excerpts from a diary kept by John Bertelsen during his early days at Emdrup Junk Playground)
 O'Connor, Amanda Rae; Palmer, James F., 2003, Skrammellegepladsen: Denmark's first adventure play area, In, Schuster, Rudy, ed. Proceedings of the 2002 Northeastern Recreation Research Symposium. Pp. 79-85, Newtown Square, PA: U.S. Department of Agriculture, Forest Service, Northeastern Research Station. 

Playgrounds
Adventure playgrounds